Josefův Důl is a municipality and village in Mladá Boleslav District in the Central Bohemian Region of the Czech Republic. It has about 400 inhabitants.

Geography
It lies in the Jizera Table. The municipality is situated on the left bank of the Jizera River, in a meander, which forms the northern and western municipal border.

History
The area originally belonged to Kosmonosy and in 1760, it was bought by Countess Marie Johana Bolza-Martinic. Josefův Důl was founded as a workers' colony in 1764, when a dyehouse was established here by Count Josef Bolza and its employees settled in its vicinity. The name Josefův Důl first appeared in 1790.

Sights
The most valuable building in Josefův Důl is the so-called Josefův Důl Castle. It is a Neorenaissance villa built after 1860 for the then owner of the local factory, Friedrich von Leitenberger.

References

External links

Villages in Mladá Boleslav District